Aggregation may refer to:

Business and economics
 Aggregation problem (economics)
 Purchasing aggregation, the joining of multiple purchasers in a group purchasing organization to increase their buying power
 Community Choice Aggregation, the joining of geographically contiguous communities to bypass a conventional energy utility monopoly and seek a greener energy service

Computer science and telecommunication
 Aggregate function, a type of function in data processing
 Aggregation, a form of object composition in object-oriented programming
 Link aggregation, using multiple Ethernet network cables/ports in parallel to increase link speed
 Packet aggregation, joining multiple data packets for transmission as a single unit to increase network efficiency
 Route aggregation, the process of forming a supernet in computer networking
 Aggregation, a process by which Australian country television markets were combined in the late 1980s and 1990s; see Regional television in Australia

Natural sciences and statistics
 Aggregation (ethology), any gathering of organisms
 Aggregation of soil granules to form soil structure
 Particle aggregation, direct mutual attraction between particles (atoms or molecules) via van der Waals forces or chemical bonding
 The accumulation of platelets to the site of a wound to form a platelet plug or a thrombus
 Flocculation, a process where a solute comes out of solution in the form of floc or flakes
 Overdispersion or statistical aggregation, where the variance of a distribution is higher than which we expect.
 Aggregation pheromone
 Protein aggregation, the aggregation of mis-folded proteins

Other uses
 Aggregation (linguistics), a merging of syntactic constituents
 Aggregation (magazine), a 2010–2012 Canadian online magazine

See also 
 Aggregate (disambiguation)
 Aggregator (disambiguation), a web site or computer software that aggregates syndicated web content
 Agrégation, in French-speaking countries, higher-level competitive examinations for teachers and professors
 :Category:Aggregation-based digital libraries, digital libraries that are primarily based on aggregation or harvesting of other digital libraries or repositories
 Composition (disambiguation)